José Torres (born 19 September 1958, Havana, Cuba) is a Cuban-Polish musician and percussionist.

A graduate of the Karol Lipiński Academy of Music, Torres was a founder of the first Polish salsa orchestra under the name José Torres y Salsa Tropical.  From the very beginning of his stay in Poland (except for a period of several years), he has lived in Wrocław. He has a wife Iza and sons Tomasz (drummer for Afromental) and Filip. He authored an autobiography: Salsa na wolności (Wydawnictwo Dolnośląskie, 2006).

Discography 

 1982: John Porter – China Disco (PolJazz/Pronit)
 1983: Tomasz Stańko – C.O.C.X. (PolJazz/Pronit)
 1983: Sławomir Kulpowicz – Prasad in Mangalore/Three Etudes (PolJazz)
 1983: Maanam – Nocny Patrol (Jako)
 1983: Crash – Something Beautiful But Not Expensive (JA&RO)
 1983: Zbigniew Lewandowski – Zbigniew Lewandowski (PolJazz)
 1983: String Connection – New Romantic Expectation (PolJazz)
 1985: Alex Band – Hit Of The World (Polskie Nagrania Muza)
 1986: Lewandowski Torres – Partnership (PolJazz)
 1986: Obywatel GC – Obywatel G.C. (Tonpress)
 1986: Michał Bajor – Michał Bajor Live (Muza)
 1987: Zbigniew Namysłowski – Open (Muza)
 (1987-1988) Zbigniew Lewandowski – Golden Lady (Muza)
 1988: Extra Ball – Akumulla-Torres (PolJazz)
 1988: Obywatel GC – Tak! Tak! (Muza)
 1989: Walk Away – Walk Away (Muza)
 1991: Kukla Band – Szczęśliwej drogi... (ZPR)
 1992: Obywatel GC – Obywatel świata (MMPP)
 1993: In Spector – We Are The Party (Agrofar)
 1994: Maryla Rodowicz – Marysia biesiadna (Produktion)
 1995: Nocna Zmiana Bluesa – Blues mieszka w Polsce (Hammer Music)
 1995: Stanisław Soyka – Sonety Shakespeare (Pomaton EMI)
 1995: Maseli Ścierański Torres – Music Painters (Govi Records)
 1996: Graża T. – Świerszcze (Pomaton EMI)
 1996: Amirian – Bardzo Niebieskie Migdały (Poligram)
 1996: Marek Raduli – Meksykański symbol szczęścia (New Abra)
 1996: Urszula – Akustycznie (Govi Records)
 (1996-1997) Ryszard Rynkowski – Jawa (Pomaton EMI 0724385615627)
 1997: Music Painters – Inna bajka (Govi Records)
 1997: Zbigniew Namysłowski – Dances (Polonia Records)
 1997: Michał Lorenc – Blood & Wine (picture soundtrack)
 1997: Michał Lorenc – Bandyta (picture soundtrack)
 1997: Kayah – Kamień (Zic Zac)
 1997: Majka Jeżowska – Kochaj czworonogi
 (1997-1998: Beata Bednarz – Co jest grane (YAKO)
 1998: Kayah – Zebra (Zic Zac)
 1998: Marek Kościkiewicz – Tylko błękit (BMG Poland)
 1998: Stare Dobre Małżeństwo – Miejska strona Księżyca (New Abra)
 1998: Budka Suflera – Budka Suflera Akustycznie (New Abra)
 1998: Raz Dwa Trzy – Niecud (Pomaton EMI)
 1998: Marek Kościkiewicz – Tylko błękit (Zic Zac)
 1999: Kostek Joriadis – Przebudzenie (BMG)
 1999: Mietek Jurecki – 12 sprawiedliwych (New Abra)
 1999: Marcin Pospieszalski – Prawo ojca
 2000: Maryla Rodowicz – Karnawał 2000
 2000: Stonehenge – Echo Wyspy (RMF FM Kraków)
 2000: Mietek Szcześniak – Spoza nas
 2001: José Torres y Salsa Tropical – José Torres y Salsa Tropical (RMF FM Kraków)
 2002: PH Connection (Budapeszt)
 2006: Blue Café – Ovosho (EMI Music Poland)
 2010: José Torres y Salsa Tropical – Torres Salsa Carnaval
 2011: Afromental – The B.O.M.B. (EMI Music Poland)

Filmography
 "Moja Kuba, moja Polska" (2007, film dokumentalny, reżyseria: Maria Zmarz-Koczanowicz)

References

Conga players
1958 births
Living people
Musicians from Wrocław
Cuban percussionists
People from Havana
Cuban emigrants to Poland